The men's 4 × 200 metre freestyle relay event at the 2018 Commonwealth Games was held on 8 April at the Gold Coast Aquatic Centre.

Records
Prior to this competition, the existing world and Commonwealth Games records were as follows.

The following records were established during the competition:

Results
The final was held at 22:01.

References

Men's 4 x 200 metre freestyle relay
Commonwealth Games